Ivan Georgiev (born 29 May 1985) is a Bulgarian football player, currently playing for Akademik Svishtov as a goalkeeper.

Career
In July 2018, Georgiev joined Spartak Pleven.

References

External links
 

1985 births
Living people
Sportspeople from Sliven
Bulgarian footballers
First Professional Football League (Bulgaria) players
Second Professional Football League (Bulgaria) players
PFC Belite Orli Pleven players
FC Chavdar Etropole players
OFC Sliven 2000 players
PFC Svetkavitsa players
Neftochimic Burgas players
FC Dunav Ruse players
PFC Spartak Pleven players
Association football goalkeepers